José Antonio Valentín (born October 12, 1969) is a Puerto Rican former American Major League Baseball infielder. He played for the Milwaukee Brewers (–), Chicago White Sox (–), Los Angeles Dodgers, and New York Mets (–). His son Jesmuel was a 1st round pick by the Dodgers in the 2012 MLB draft.

Baseball career

Early years
Valentín was signed on October 12, by the San Diego Padres as an amateur free agent. However, he was sent to the Milwaukee Brewers on March 26, 1992 with Ricky Bones and Matt Mieske in exchange for Gary Sheffield and Minor League prospect Geoff Kellogg. He made his major league debut with the Brewers on September 17, 1992. On January 12, 2000, and after eight seasons with the Brewers, he was traded with Cal Eldred to the Chicago White Sox in exchange for Jaime Navarro and John Snyder. He played five seasons with the White Sox before becoming a free agent on October 29, 2004.

Decline and injuries
As Valentín got older, however, his range in the field lessened with his foot speed. Therefore, he shifted from a strict shortstop to a player who can handle duties at third base, second base, shortstop and left field. He hit a career-high 30 home runs in 2004, but had a league-worst .216 batting average. On December 21, 2004, he was signed by the Los Angeles Dodgers. However, during spring training, he went down with torn ligaments in his left knee, and ended up with only a .170 batting average in 56 games that season after he returned, serving as a third baseman, left fielder and lefty pinch-hitter. Due to Valentin's struggles, he began to bat strictly left-handed for a time being rather than switch hitting. He would resume switch hitting later in his career. On October 27 of the same year, the Dodgers granted him free agency.

Resurgence with the Mets

On December 12, 2005, Valentín signed with the New York Mets hoping to make the team as a utility player off the bench, but rebounded from the previous season to have one of the best seasons of his career. He emerged as one of the most solid players in the line-up, becoming the Mets regular second baseman after they traded away Kazuo Matsui. His consistent hitting played a big part in helping the Mets to the 2006 National League Eastern Division title. Valentín capped off his great regular season by hitting two home runs against the Florida Marlins on September 18, 2006, in the division-clinching game.

Valentín agreed to switch his uniform number from 18 to 22 for the newly signed Moisés Alou a few days later. On July 20, 2007, Valentín fouled a ball off his right leg, breaking his tibia and ending his season after 51 games and a .241 batting average. He re-signed with the Mets to a minor league contract on January 18, 2008, with an invitation to spring training. With the Triple-A New Orleans Zephyrs, Valentin told the Mets his season was over on June 21, due to physical and mental wear and tear. The Mets released him shortly thereafter. In February , he re-signed with the Mets to a minor league contract; he was released after not making the team out of Spring training.

Major league statistics
Valentín had success as one of the few shortstops with good home run power, averaging 25 homers and 80 RBI over a 162-game season for his career. Although he only has a .243 lifetime batting average (the lowest average among all qualified active players), he has established a .332 lifetime on-base percentage, evidencing his propensity to walk.

Post-retirement career

Owner/Player of Santurce Crabbers

In 2004 it was announced that Valentín bought the Santurce Crabbers, one of the most historic professional baseball franchises of the Puerto Rico Baseball League (formerly known as LBPPR). He relocated the team to his native town, and renamed them the Manatí Atenienses. But after a decline in attendance and the restructuring of the league, Valentín moved the team back to Santurce in 2008, therefore launching the return of the Cangrejeros. He joined his home team as their second baseman becoming the only owner-player in the league.

Double A coach

In 2011, Valentín became the manager of the Mulos de Manatí team of the Puerto Rico Double A Baseball League.

Manager Fort Wayne Tin Caps
In 2012 Jose became the manager for the Fort Wayne Tin Caps baseball team which is the Class A minor league farm team of the San Diego Padres. He has been recently referred to as "sleepy" because his uniform number 22 looks like two "z's".

Bench coach of Leones de Ponce

In 2012, Valentín served as bench coach for the Leones de Ponce team of the Puerto Rico Baseball League.

Puerto Rican team assistant coach

During the 2013 World Baseball Classic, Valentín served as one of the assistant coaches under Edwin Rodríguez. He was mostly seen as a first-base coach.

First base coach of San Diego Padres

After the end of the 2013 season, Jose was promoted to the 1st base coach for the  San Diego Padres after bench coach Rick Renteria was hired as manager of the Chicago Cubs and former 1st base coach Dave Roberts became bench coach.

Personal life

Valentín is married and has three children. His son, Jesmuel, was a Major League prospect with the Baltimore Orioles organization.

Valentín is the older brother of major league catcher Javier Valentín.

See also
 List of Major League Baseball career home run leaders
 List of Major League Baseball players to hit for the cycle

References

External links

1969 births
Living people
People from Manatí, Puerto Rico
Milwaukee Brewers players
Chicago White Sox players
Los Angeles Dodgers players
New York Mets players
San Diego Padres coaches
Major League Baseball shortstops
Major League Baseball third basemen
Major League Baseball outfielders
Major League Baseball players from Puerto Rico
Major League Baseball second basemen
Major League Baseball first base coaches
Minor league baseball managers
Spokane Indians players
Charleston Rainbows players
Wichita Wranglers players
Riverside Red Wave players
Denver Zephyrs players
New Orleans Zephyrs players
Beloit Snappers players
Louisville RiverBats players
Charlotte Knights players
Las Vegas 51s players
St. Lucie Mets players
2006 World Baseball Classic players
Caribbean Series managers
Cangrejeros de Santurce (baseball) players